Freddy Alejandro Serrano Sichaca (born September 22, 1979) is a male former Olympic freestyle wrestler from Colombia and a current mixed martial artist. A professional MMA competitor since 2013, he has formerly competed for the UFC and was also on The Ultimate Fighter: Latin America.

Wrestling career
Born in Bogotá, Distrito Capital, Serrano began wrestling in 1990 at the age of 11. In 2007 he became the 55 kg Pan Am bronze medalist.

2008 Olympics
Serrano participated in Men's freestyle 55 kg at 2008 Summer Olympics as a representative of Colombia. He ended up losing to Abbas Dabbaghi from Iran in the Round of 16.

Mixed martial arts career

Early career
At the beginning of 2013, Serrano retired from wrestling to focus on his MMA career.  He had two unsanctioned MMA fights in 2013, both of which he won.

In March 2014, Serrano was announced as having signed an 8-fight contract with Resurrection Fighting Alliance. However, he never debuted before joining the cast of The Ultimate Fighter.

The Ultimate Fighter
In May 2014, Serrano was announced as a member of the cast of fighters participating The Ultimate Fighter: Latin America. He competed as a bantamweight for Team Werdum.  In his first fight on the show, Serrano lost to Alejandro Pérez by unanimous decision.

Serrano faced former TUF: Latin America castmate Bentley Syler on March 21, 2015 at UFC Fight Night 62. Serrano won the fight by knockout in the third round. The win earned him a Performance of the Night bonus .

Serrano faced Yao Zhikui on November 28, 2015 at UFC Fight Night 79. He won the fight via TKO in the first round after Yao severely injured his arm while trying to defend a takedown.

Serrano was originally expected to face Ray Borg on July 30, 2016 at UFC 201. However Borg pulled out of the fight and was replaced by Ryan Benoit. He lost the fight via split decision.

Serrano faced Hector Sandoval on December 17, 2016 at UFC on Fox 22. He lost the fight via unanimous decision and was subsequently released from the promotion.

Accomplishments

Mixed martial arts
Ultimate Fighting Championship
Performance of the Night (One time) vs Bentley Syler
MMAJunkie.com
2015 March Knockout of the Month vs. Bentley Syler

Mixed martial arts record

|-
|Win
|align=center|4–2
|Joseph Vieira da Silva
|Decision (Unanimous)
|Empire Sports Marketing - Empire MMA 001
|
|align=center|3
|align=center|5:00
|Bogotá, Colombia
|
|-
|Loss
|align=center|3–2
|Hector Sandoval
|Decision (unanimous)
|UFC on Fox: VanZant vs. Waterson
|
|align=center|3
|align=center|5:00
|Sacramento, California, United States
|
|-
|Loss
|align=center|3–1
|Ryan Benoit
|Decision (split)
|UFC 201 
|
|align=center|3
|align=center|5:00
|Atlanta, Georgia, United States
| 
|-
|Win
|align=center|3–0
|Yao Zhikui
|TKO (arm injury)
|UFC Fight Night: Henderson vs. Masvidal
|
|align=center|1
|align=center|0:44
|Seoul, South Korea
|
|-
|Win
|align=center|2–0
|Bentley Syler
|KO (punch)
|UFC Fight Night: Maia vs. LaFlare
|
|align=center|3
|align=center|1:34
|Rio de Janeiro, Brazil
|
|-
|Win
|align=center|1–0
|Andrés Ayala
|N/A
|Striker Fighting Championship 5
|
|align=center|N/A
|align=center|N/A
|Bogotá, Colombia
|

Mixed martial arts exhibition record

|-
|Loss
|align=center|0–1
|Alejandro Pérez
|Decision (unanimous)
|The Ultimate Fighter: Latin America
|
|align=center|3
|align=center|5:00
|Las Vegas, Nevada
|

See also
 List of current UFC fighters
 List of male mixed martial artists

References

External links
 
 
 Athlete bio on beijing2008
 

Living people
1979 births
Colombian male mixed martial artists
Mixed martial artists utilizing freestyle wrestling
Mixed martial artists utilizing Brazilian jiu-jitsu
Olympic wrestlers of Colombia
Wrestlers at the 2007 Pan American Games
Wrestlers at the 2008 Summer Olympics
Colombian male sport wrestlers
Colombian practitioners of Brazilian jiu-jitsu
Sportspeople from Bogotá
Pan American Games bronze medalists for Colombia
Pan American Games medalists in wrestling
Medalists at the 2007 Pan American Games
Ultimate Fighting Championship male fighters
21st-century Colombian people